Zoran Zeljković (born 9 May 1980) is a Slovenian professional football manager and former player who is the manager of Slovenian PrvaLiga club FC Koper.

Honours
Domžale
Slovenian PrvaLiga: 2006–07

Interblock
Slovenian Cup: 2007–08, 2008–09
Supercup: 2008

External links
Player profile at NZS 

1980 births
Living people
Footballers from Ljubljana
Slovenian footballers
Association football midfielders
Slovenian Second League players
Slovenian PrvaLiga players
Cypriot First Division players
Nemzeti Bajnokság I players
NK Ivančna Gorica players
NK Ljubljana players
NK Domžale players
NK IB 1975 Ljubljana players
APOP Kinyras FC players
NK Olimpija Ljubljana (2005) players
Pécsi MFC players
NK Krka players
NK Bravo players
Slovenian expatriate footballers
Expatriate footballers in Cyprus
Slovenian expatriate sportspeople in Cyprus
Expatriate footballers in Hungary
Slovenian expatriate sportspeople in Hungary
Expatriate footballers in Austria
Slovenian expatriate sportspeople in Austria
Slovenia international footballers
Slovenian football managers
ND Ilirija 1911 managers
NK Krka managers
FC Koper managers